"Way Too Long" is a song by English record producer Nathan Dawe, English singer Anne-Marie and British rapper MoStack. It was released on 9 April 2021 as the second single from Anne-Marie's second studio album, Therapy. The song was produced by Dawe, Tre Jean-Marie, Grades and Sire Noah, and written by the three artists, Tre-Jean Marie, Grades, MNEK, Dyo, Scribz Riley and Ryan Campbell.

A music video was released along with the song.

Track listings
Digital release
"Way Too Long" – 2:30

Digital release – Tyrone remix
"Way Too Long" (Tyrone remix) – 2:32

Digital release – Navos remix
"Way Too Long" (Navos Remix) – 2:21

Digital release – Acoustic
"Way Too Long" (Acoustic) – 2:40

Digital release – Clean Bandit remix
"Our Song" (Clean Bandit remix) – 2:39

Charts

Release history

Certifications

References 

2021 singles
Anne-Marie (singer) songs
Asylum Records singles
Nathan Dawe songs
MoStack songs
Songs written by Anne-Marie (singer)
Songs written by MoStack
Songs written by Grades (producer)
Songs written by MNEK
Songs written by Tom Barnes (songwriter)
Warner Music Group singles
Songs written by Tre Jean-Marie